TextMaker is a word processor developed by the German company SoftMaker and available as part of the SoftMaker office suite. TextMaker is available for Windows, MacOS, Linux and Android.
Some reduced versions of TextMaker are released as freeware.

History
Development of TextMaker started in 1987 under MS-DOS. The program aims at utmost compatibility with Microsoft Word (adding some proprietary features like an object mode for working with frames or a simple built-in database functionality). It reads and writes its own document format (.tmd), Microsoft Word (.doc and .docx), OpenDocument (.odt), Pocket Word (.psw, .pwd), Rich Text Format (.rtf), HTML 4.0 (.htm), and plain text files (.txt). It can also open OpenOffice.org XML (.sxw) files. The default document format can be .tmdx, .tmd, .docx, .doc, .rtf, or .odt.

Multilingual features include a five language translation dictionary, a thesaurus in ten languages, spell checking in 17, hyphenation in 29, and user interface in 31 languages.

VBA-compatible scripting is supported through SoftMaker's scripting language, called BasicMaker, which is part of its SoftMaker Office suite for Windows.

For mobile use, TextMaker can be run from a USB stick without changing any registry or system files of the host PC.

Latest versions
TextMaker 2021 for Microsoft Windows, MacOS, Linux and Android
TextMaker 2010 for Pocket PCs and Windows CE 4.2 (no longer available)
TextMaker 2006 for FreeBSD and Handheld PC 2000 (no longer available)
TextMaker 2002 for Sharp Zaurus (no longer available)
TextMaker is the only word processor worldwide to support all these systems. Furthermore, it supports the same feature set on all platforms. The mobile versions offer the full functionality of the desktop versions, with the user interface tailored to small screens and touch use.

See also
 List of word processors
 Comparison of word processors
 Office Open XML software
 OpenDocument software

References

External links
TextMaker product page
TextMaker product page on North America

Word processors
Windows word processors
MacOS word processors
Linux word processors